Krishna Kumar Singh was an Indian politician. He was a member of Bharatiya Janata Party and a member of the BJP State Executive. He was a member of the Bihar Legislative Council from 2014–2020.

Early life
Krishna Kumar Singh was born on 23 September 1946 in Gaya. His father was Surya Deep Narayan Singh. His early education took place at Rajendra Vidyalaya. He obtained ISC and BSc from Gaya College. He obtained his MSc degree from Gaya College (Magadha University).

Career 
He started a business marketing pumping sets and electrical goods in Gaya in 1967.

Politics
In 1980, he entered active politics and contested the assembly elections from Belaganj Vidhan Sabha of Gaya district. He was the BJP district president of Gaya district for three terms. In 1992, he served as President of the State Executive of BJP Bihar. He became president of the Udyog Manch of Bihar state. He served as a member of National Working Committee of National Kisan Morcha BJP. He was the national secretary of non-conventional energy. He was elected member of Bihar Legislative Council in 2014.

In 2000, he established Kumar Organic Products Ltd, in Karnataka.

Recognition

 1987 National Award for Small Industries.

Personal life
Krishna Kumar Singh married Usha Singh from Ahiyapur Unch Village in 1964. The couple has two sons. He has three grandsons and one granddaughter.

References

1946 births
Living people
Bharatiya Janata Party politicians from Bihar
Members of the Bihar Legislative Council